Dolenja Vas pri Artičah is a village west of Artiče in the Municipality of Brežice in eastern Slovenia. The area is part of the traditional region of Styria. It is now included with the rest of the municipality in the Lower Sava Statistical Region.

Name
The name of the settlement was changed from Dolenja vas to Dolenja vas pri Artičah in 1953. In the past the German name was Niederdorf.

References

External links
Dolenja Vas pri Artičah on Geopedia

Populated places in the Municipality of Brežice